Sandona is a town and municipality in Nariño Department, Colombia.

External links
 Sandona official website
 Mariana University; history of Sandona

References

Municipalities of Nariño Department